Saint Agathoclia (Agathocleia) (d. ~230 AD) is venerated as a patron saint of Mequinenza, Aragón, Spain.  Her feast day is September 17.

Biography
Tradition states that she was a virgin Christian slave owned by two people who had converted to paganism from Christianity, named Nicolas and Paulina. They subjected Agathoclia to regular physical abuse, including whipping and other violence, in an effort to get Agathoclia to renounce her faith. She repeatedly refused to do so.

Her owners then subjected her to a public trial by a local magistrate. There too, she refused to renounce Christianity, which subjected her to savage mangling from the authorities. When she was found guilty, her sentence included having her tongue cut out, a nonfatal injury.

There is some disagreement about how Agathoclia met her death. Some sources say that her mistress Paulina poured burning coals on her neck. Other sources say that she herself was cast into fire.

Veneration
The town of Mequinenza celebrates festivals in honor of Santa Agatoclia (called simply “La Santa”) from September 16 to 20. There is also a confraternity in the town dedicated to the saint.

See also
List of enslaved people

Notes

References

Sources
Mequinensa page
Brotherhood of Saint Agatoclia page
Catholic Forum page
St. Nicholas Russian Orthodox Church Dallas Texas page on Agathocleia
The Roman Martyrology for September 17
Dominican Martyrology page on September feasts
September 17 page of grousrv.com

3rd-century births
3rd-century deaths
Saints from Hispania
3rd-century Roman women
3rd-century Christian saints
Christian slaves and freedmen
Ante-Nicene Christian female saints
Christian martyrs